Moses Jn. Baptiste is a St. Lucian politician. He is the Parliamentary Representative for Vieux Fort North. 

Jn. Baptiste resides in Pierrot, Vieux-Fort. Before entering politics, Moses was an agricultural science teacher at the Vieux Fort Comprehensive Secondary School Campus A and then moved on to be the head master at the Vieux Fort Primary school. Jn. Baptiste is part of a local cultural and drumming called "tanbou melee." He successfully contested the 2006 general elections in St. Lucia and is a first term Parliamentarian. Hon. Moses Jn. Baptiste is the Labour Party's spokesperson on Rural Development, Agriculture and Culture.

He is also a poet, farmer and dramatist.

References

Living people
Members of the House of Assembly of Saint Lucia
Year of birth missing (living people)
Saint Lucia Labour Party politicians
People from Vieux Fort Quarter